Maggie (Multiprocess ActionScript Generic Game Interface Engine) is a programming library developed in ActionScript 3.0 to create Flash games.

General
Maggie programming is very similar to languages such as DIV or Fenix Project, which makes it very easy to develop games. Maggie is based on basic Flash components so no need to import any special package for programming with this library.

Features
 Emulate multithreaded programming ActionScript 3.0 (threading is not supported in this language).
 Graphics handling.
 Sounds.
 Keyboard and mouse input.
 Inter-process communication.

Supported Browsers
 Google Chrome
 Mozilla Firefox
 Opera
 Safari
 Internet Explorer

External links
 Maggie - Maggie web page.
 Maggie - on SourceForge.
 Demo - Demo of a game developed with Maggie.

Video game engines
Adobe Flash